All the Sad World Needs is a 1918 British silent drama film directed by Hubert Herrick and starring Lauri de Frece, Joan Legge and Lennox Pawle.

Cast
 Lauri de Frece as Peep O'Day  
 Joan Legge as Rhoda Grover 
 Lennox Pawle as George Grover  
 Adelaide Grace as Miss Flint  
 Cyprian Hyde as Ernest Hanbury

References

Bibliography
 Low, Rachael. History of the British Film, 1918–1929. George Allen & Unwin, 1971.

External links

1918 films
1918 drama films
British silent feature films
British drama films
British black-and-white films
1910s English-language films
1910s British films
Silent drama films